WCKV-LD, virtual and UHF digital channel 22, is a low-powered Walk TV-affiliated television station licensed to Clarksville, Tennessee, United States. The station is owned by TN Media Group, Inc. WCKV-LD's transmitter is located at the corner of Franklin and Second Streets in downtown Clarksville. On cable, the station is available on CDE Lightband channel 12 and Charter Spectrum channel 6.

History
The station began broadcasting on May 28, 1998 on UHF analog channel 69 under the callsign W69EC. In 2000, the call letters were changed to WCKV-LP, and the station moved to UHF channel 49. WCKV-LP launched their digital signal on W30DE-D, which started broadcasting on UHF digital channel 30 in 2010, with their analog signal being closed down in a flash-cut procedure days later. The station changed their call letters to the current WCKV-LD in 2013.

Digital television

Digital channels
The station's digital signal is multiplexed:

Programming
Aside from programming from The Walk TV, WCKV offers an array of local programming, like Clarksville's Top Spots, Tennessee's Wild Side, and many more. The Walk TV's programming includes a mixture of family, healthy-lifestyle, and religious programming, similar to those of CTN and Doctor TV. One hour of children's programming is broadcast Monday through Saturday from 3 to 4 p.m. CT, making a total of six hours of children's educational programming. Some public domain movies and episodes of Bonanza are also aired.

In March 2015, WCKV-LD began carrying Doctor TV programming on DT2, and classic programming on DT3, with DT4 carrying the NRB Network.

In 2018, Doctor TV was dropped from DT2 and was replaced with a simulcast of DT1. Two years later on June 15, 2020, The DT1 simulcast was replaced with Right Now TV. (A channel that is focused towards a male audience.)

Coverage area
The station now broadcasts from a tower mast at the corner of Franklin and Second Streets in downtown Clarksville. With its 10,000 watts of power, its over-the-air signal can cover all of Montgomery County, reach into parts of Dickson, Cheatham, Houston, Robertson, and Stewart counties of northwestern Middle Tennessee. Thanks to the city's proximity to the Kentucky state line, the signal can also penetrate some parts of Christian, Todd, and Trigg counties of western Kentucky. At least Grade B coverage of WCKV is available as far north as Hopkinsville and Elkton.

References

External links
WCKV-LD Query at the CDBS RecNet database
THE WALK TV

Television stations in Tennessee
1998 establishments in Tennessee
Clarksville, Tennessee
Television channels and stations established in 1998
Low-power television stations in the United States